Le Samouraï, is a 1967 Franco-Italian neo-noir crime thriller film written and directed by Jean-Pierre Melville and starring Alain Delon, François Périer, Nathalie Delon and Cathy Rosier. It depicts the intersecting paths of a professional hitman (Delon) trying to find out who hired him for a job and then tried to have him killed, and the Parisian commissaire (Périer) trying to catch him.

The film was released on 25 October 1967, and it sold over 1.9 million tickets in France. It received positive reviews, with particular praise given to Melville's screenwriting and atmospheric direction, and Delon's performance. An English-dubbed version of the film was released in the U.S. in 1972 as The Godson, a title selected to capitalize on the recent success of The Godfather.

Plot
Impassive hitman Jef Costello lives in a spartan single-room Paris apartment and keeps a small bird in a cage as a pet. His methodical modus operandi involves creating airtight alibis, including ones provided by his lover, Jane. After carrying out a contract killing on Martey, the owner of a nightclub, Jef is very clearly seen leaving the scene by the club's piano player, Valérie, and glimpsed by several other witnesses. The police bring in numerous suspects, including Jef, for a lineup, but the witnesses do not agree on an identification.

Jef is released, but the Commissaire has a hunch he is the culprit and has him followed. He loses the tail and goes to collect his fee for the hit, but, instead of paying him, the man he meets tries to kill him, shooting him in the arm, and Jef realizes his unknown employers now see him as a liability because he is a suspect in Martey's murder. After treating his wound, Jef returns to the nightclub. While he is gone, two police officers bug his room, agitating the bird in its cage.

After the nightclub closes, Jef has Valérie take him to her home, reasoning that she told the police he was not the killer because his employer had told her to do so. He asks her to tell him who hired him, and she tells him to call her in two hours. Meanwhile, the police search Jane's apartment, saying they will leave her alone if she withdraws her alibi for Jef, but she flatly rejects the offer.

Back at his apartment, Jef notices some loose feathers scattered around his bird's cage, as though it had gotten worked up while he was gone. Suspecting an intrusion, he finds the bug and deactivates it, and then goes to a public phone to call Valérie, but she does not answer. When he gets home, he is ambushed by the man who shot him. At gunpoint, the man offers a fresh start and pays Jef for the hit on Martey, as well as for an upcoming one. Jef overpowers the man and forces him to disclose the identity of his boss, Olivier Rey, before asking about the new contract.

Dozens of undercover police officers attempt to tail Jef in the Métro, but he is able to lose them. He visits Jane and assures her everything will work out, and then drives to Rey's house, which is where Valérie lives, though she is not home at the moment. Jef kills Rey and returns to the nightclub, this time making no attempt to conceal his presence. He checks his hat, but leaves his hat-check ticket on the counter, and puts on white gloves, which he wears when carrying out his hits, in full view of everyone, before approaching the stage, where Valérie is performing. She quietly advises him to leave, but he pulls out a gun and points it at her. Strangely unafraid, she asks him why he is doing this, and he responds he was paid to do so. Suddenly, Jef is shot four times by policemen who had been waiting for him. When the Commissaire inspects Jef's gun, he discovers it does not contain any bullets.

Cast

 Alain Delon as Jef Costello
 François Périer as the Commissaire
 Nathalie Delon as Jane Lagrange, Jef and Wiener's girlfriend
 Cathy Rosier (credited as Caty Rosier) as Valérie, the pianist at Martey's
 Jacques Leroy as "The Man on the Bridge", a hitman working for Rey
 Michel Boisrond as Wiener, Jane's wealthy boyfriend
 Robert Favart as the bartender at Martey's, who is a witness at the lineup
 Jean-Pierre Posier as Olivier Rey, who has Martey killed
 Catherine Jourdan as the hatcheck girl at Martey's, who is a witness at the lineup
 Roger Fradet as a police inspector who works for the Commissaire
 Carlo Nell as a police inspector who works for the Commissaire
 Robert Rondo as a police inspector who works for the Commissaire
 André Salgues as the man in the garage who gives Jef his contracts
 André Thorent as the policeman disguised as a taxi driver who follows Jef when he is released from custody
 Jacques Deschamps as the policeman at the microphone during the lineup
 Georges Casati as Ange Séraphin Damolini, the first suspect in the lineup
 Jack Léonard as Juan Garcia, the second suspect in the lineup
 Pierre Vaudier as the policeman who bugs Jef's apartment
 Maurice Magalon as the partner of the policeman who bugs Jef's apartment
 Gaston Meunier as the head waiter at Martey's, who is a witness at the lineup
 Jean Gold as a customer at Martey's who is a witness at the lineup
 Georges Billy as a customer at Martey's who is a witness at the lineup
 Ari Aricardi as a poker player
 Guy Bonnafoux as a poker player
 Humberto Catalano as a police inspector
 Carl Lechner as a suspect who looks very similar to Jef
 Maria Maneva as "the girl with chewing gum" who follows Jef in the subway

Production
Melville wrote the film for Delon. It was the first film for Delon's wife, Nathalie. He filed for divorce after the film wrapped, but they terminated the divorce proceedings a few days later, though they separated in June 1968 and their divorce became official in February 1969, with Nathalie being granted custody of their son, Anthony. François Périer, who played the Commissaire, was a comedian cast against type.

Studios Jenner, Melville's private film studio, was destroyed by a fire on June 29, 1967, while Le Samouraï was in production. Melville, who termed the blaze "suspicious", finished the shoot at another studio.

Alternative ending
In an interview with Rui Nogueira, Melville said he had originally filmed Jef Costello meeting his death with a picture-perfect grin, but he modified the scene after discovering Delon had a smiling death scene in another of his films. Production stills of the smiling death exist.

Release and reception

Box office
Le Samourai was released in France on 25 October 1967. It sold over 1.9 million tickets in France, and over 797,011 tickets in Spain. First released in theaters in the United States in 1972, it grossed $39,481 from a 1997 re-release.

Critical response
On review aggregator website Rotten Tomatoes, the film has a 100% approval rating based on 33 reviews, and an average score of 8.5/10; the site's "critics consensus" reads: "Le Samouraï makes the most of its spare aesthetic, using stylish – and influential – direction, solid performances, and thick atmosphere to weave an absorbing story."

A 1967 review in Variety called the film "a curious hybrid" that "appears a bit too solemn to inject all the suspense, action and characterization [Melville] seeks", and said it "almost seems to be an American film dubbed into French" and "could be cut a bit".

Vincent Canby of The New York Times called the original film "immaculate", but criticized the dubbing of the 1972 version released in the U.S. as The Godson as "disorienting" and "dreadful".

In a 1997 review of the film that later appeared in his first The Great Movies collection of essays, Roger Ebert gave the film four out of four stars, writing: "Like a painter or a musician, a filmmaker can suggest complete mastery with just a few strokes. Jean-Pierre Melville involves us in the spell of Le Samourai (1967) before a word is spoken. He does it with light: a cold light, like dawn on an ugly day. And color: grays and blues. And actions that speak in place of words."

In 2010, the film was ranked No. 39 on Empires list of "The 100 Best Films Of World Cinema".

Writing in Le Figaro of the Delons' performances after Nathalie's death in 2021, Bertrand Guyard noted that the husband and wife are both nearly silent in the film, but "their gazes, fraught with meaning, are enough to make the camera quiver", and the director was able to create from their portrayals "a mythical couple of the seventh art."

Influence and legacy
The film has influenced numerous other works and directors:
 Walter Hill's 1978 film The Driver features a similar dynamic between a reluctant female witness and a getaway driver.
 John Woo's 1989 film The Killer was heavily influenced by the plot of Le Samouraï, with the pianist replaced by a singer. Chow Yun-fat's character Jeffrey Chow (the international character name for Ah Jong) was inspired by Alain Delon's similarly-named character Jef Costello. Woo acknowledged the influence by writing a short essay on Le Samouraï and Melville's techniques for the film's Criterion Collection DVD release.
 Jim Jarmusch paid homage to Le Samouraï with the 1999 crime-drama Ghost Dog: The Way of the Samurai, starring Forest Whitaker as a meditative, loner assassin who lives by the bushido code. Just as Costello has a huge ring of keys that enables him to steal any Citroën DS, the hitman Ghost Dog has an electronic "key" to break into luxury cars.
 Pang Ho-Cheung's 2001 crime-and-filmmaking comedy You Shoot, I Shoot features Eric Kot as a hitman who idolizes Alain Delon's Jef Costello, dressing like the character and speaking to Costello via a Le Samouraï poster in his apartment.
 Johnnie To's 2009 film Vengeance is an homage to Melville’s gangster films, and the main character is a retired assassin whose last name is Costello. To offered the role to Alain Delon, who turned it down.
 Anton Corbijn's 2010 film The American stars George Clooney as an assassin, who bears a resemblance to Costello, hiding in a small Italian village.
 Nicolas Winding Refn's 2011 film Drive stars Ryan Gosling as a nameless protagonist who shares key characteristics with Costello.
 Madonna's 2012 song "Beautiful Killer" is an homage to Alain Delon and alludes to his role in Le Samouraï with the lines: "You are a beautiful killer / I like your silhouette when you stand on the streets / Like a samurai you can handle the heat / Makes me wanna pray for a haunted man."
Adilkhan Yerzhanov's 2020 film Yellow Cat features a protagonist who quotes and performs scenes from Le Samourai throughout the film as a major character trait.

See also
 List of films featuring surveillance
 List of films with a 100% rating on Rotten Tomatoes

References

Further reading
 Nogueira, Rui (ed.). 1971. Melville on Melville. New York: Viking Press.  (hardbound),  (paperbound)
 Palmer, Tim. 2006. Le Samouraï In Phil Powrie (ed.), The Cinema of France. London: Wallflower Press.  (hardbound),  (paperbound)
 Vincendeau, Ginette. 2003. ''Jean-Pierre Melville : 'an American in Paris'''. London: British Film Institute.  (hardbound),  (paperback)

External links

 
 
 Le Samouraï: Death in White Gloves an essay by David Thomson at the Criterion Collection

1960s crime thriller films
1967 films
Films about contract killing
Films directed by Jean-Pierre Melville
Films set in Paris
Films shot in Paris
French crime thriller films
Italian crime thriller films
French neo-noir films
Films produced by Raymond Borderie
Films scored by François de Roubaix
1960s Italian films
1960s French films